Lester Bowles "Mike" Pearson  (23 April 1897 – 27 December 1972) was a Canadian scholar, statesman, diplomat, and politician who served as the 14th prime minister of Canada from 1963 to 1968.

Born in Newtonbrook, Ontario (now part of Toronto), Pearson pursued a career in the Department of External Affairs. He served as Canadian ambassador to the United States from 1944 to 1946 and secretary of state for external affairs from 1948 to 1957 under Liberal Prime Ministers William Lyon Mackenzie King and Louis St. Laurent. He narrowly lost the bid to become secretary-general of the United Nations in 1953. However, he won the Nobel Peace Prize in 1957 for organizing the United Nations Emergency Force to resolve the Suez Canal Crisis, which earned him attention worldwide. After the Liberals' defeat in the 1957 federal election, Pearson easily won the leadership of the Liberal Party in 1958. Pearson suffered two consecutive defeats by Progressive Conservative Prime Minister John Diefenbaker in 1958 and 1962, only to successfully challenge him for a third time in the 1963 federal election. Pearson would win re-election in 1965.

Pearson ran two back-to-back minority governments during his tenure, and the Liberals not having a majority in the House of Commons meant he needed support from the opposition parties. With that support, Pearson launched progressive policies such as universal health care, the Canada Student Loan Program, and the Canada Pension Plan. Pearson also introduced the Order of Canada and the Royal Commission on Bilingualism and Biculturalism, and oversaw the creation of the Maple Leaf flag that was implemented in 1965. His government unified the Canadian Armed Forces and kept Canada out of the Vietnam War. In 1967, Canada became the first country in the world to implement a points-based immigration system. After half a decade in power, Pearson resigned as prime minister and retired from politics.

With his government programs and policies, together with his groundbreaking work at the United Nations and in international diplomacy, which included his role in ending the Suez Crisis, Pearson is generally considered among the most influential Canadians of the 20th century and is ranked among the greatest Canadian prime ministers.

Early life, family, and education

Pearson was born in Newtonbrook (now a part of Toronto) in the township of York, Ontario, the son of Annie Sarah (née Bowles) and Edwin Arthur Pearson, a Methodist (later United Church of Canada) minister. Lester was the brother of Vaughan Whitier Pearson and Marmaduke (Duke) Pearson. When Pearson was one month old, his family moved to 1984 Yonge Street. Lester Pearson's father moved the young family north of Toronto to Aurora, Ontario, where he was the minister at Aurora Methodist Church on Yonge Street. Lester spent his early years in Aurora and attended the public school on Church Street. The family lived at 39 Catherine Avenue. Pearson was a member of the Aurora Rugby team.

Pearson graduated from Hamilton Collegiate Institute in Hamilton, Ontario, in 1913 at the age of 16. Later that same year, he entered Victoria College at the University of Toronto, where he lived in residence in Gate House and shared a room with his brother Duke. He was later elected to the Pi Gamma Mu social sciences honour society's chapter at the University of Toronto for his outstanding scholastic performance in history and psychology. Just as Norman Jewison, E. J. Pratt, Northrop Frye and his student Margaret Atwood would, Pearson participated in the sophomore theatrical tradition of The Bob Comedy Revue. After Victoria College, Pearson won a scholarship to study at St John's College, Oxford, from 1921 to 1923.

Sporting interests
At the University of Toronto, Pearson became a noted athlete, excelling in rugby union and also playing basketball. He later also played for the Oxford University Ice Hockey Club while on a scholarship at the University of Oxford, a team that won the first Spengler Cup in 1923. Pearson also excelled in baseball and lacrosse as a youth. His baseball talents as an infielder were strong enough for a summer of semi-pro play with the Guelph Maple Leafs of the Ontario Intercounty Baseball League. Pearson toured North America with a combined Oxford and Cambridge Universities lacrosse team in 1923. After he joined the University of Toronto History Department as an instructor, he helped to coach the U of T's football and hockey teams. He played golf and tennis to high standards as an adult.

First World War

During World War I, Pearson volunteered for service as a medical orderly with the University of Toronto Hospital Unit. In 1915, he entered overseas service with the Canadian Army Medical Corps as a stretcher-bearer with the rank of private, and was subsequently promoted to corporal. During this period of service, he spent nearly two years in Southern Europe, being shipped to Egypt and thereafter served on the Salonika front. He also served alongside the Serbian Army as a medical orderly. On 2 August 1917, Pearson was commissioned a temporary lieutenant. The Royal Canadian Air Force did not exist at that time, so Pearson transferred to Britain's Royal Flying Corps, where he served as a flying officer. It was as a pilot that he received the nickname of "Mike", given to him by a flight instructor who felt that "Lester" was too mild a name for an airman: "That’s a sissy’s name. You’re Mike," the instructor said. Thereafter, Pearson would use the name "Lester" on official documents and in public life, but was always addressed as "Mike" by friends and family.

Pearson learned to fly at an air training school in Hendon, England. He survived an airplane crash during his first flight. In 1918, Pearson was hit by a bus in London during a citywide blackout and he was sent home to recuperate, but then he was discharged from the service.

Inter-war years

After the war, he returned to school, receiving his Bachelor of Arts degree from the University of Toronto in 1919. He was able to complete his degree after one more term, under a ruling in force at the time, since he had served in the military during the war. He then spent a year working in Hamilton, Ontario, and in Chicago, in the meat-packing industry, which he did not enjoy.

Oxford
Upon receiving a scholarship from the Massey Foundation, he studied for two years at St John's College at the University of Oxford, where he received a B.A. degree with Second-Class honours in modern history in 1923, and the M.A. in 1925. After Oxford, he returned to Canada and taught history at the University of Toronto.

Marriage, family

In 1925, he married Maryon Moody, from Winnipeg, who had been one of his students at the University of Toronto. Together, they had one son, Geoffrey, and one daughter, Patricia. Maryon was confident and outspoken and she supported her husband in all his political endeavours.

Diplomat, public servant
In 1927, after scoring the top marks on the Canadian foreign service entry exam, he then embarked on a career in the Department of External Affairs. Prime Minister R. B. Bennett was a noted talent spotter. He took note of, and encouraged, the young Lester Pearson in the early 1930s, and appointed Pearson to significant roles on two major government inquiries: the 1931 Royal Commission on Grain Futures, and the 1934 Royal Commission on Price Spreads. Bennett saw that Pearson was recognized with an OBE after he shone in that work, arranged a bonus of $1,800, and invited him to a London conference. Pearson was assigned to the High Commission of Canada to the United Kingdom in 1935.

World War II and aftermath

Pearson continued to serve at Canada House during World War II from 1939 through 1942 as the second-in-command, where he coordinated military supply and refugee problems, serving under High Commissioner Vincent Massey.

Pearson returned to Ottawa for a few months, where he was an assistant under secretary from 1941 through 1942. In June 1942 he was posted to the Canadian Embassy in Washington, D.C., as a ministerial counsellor. He served as second-in-command for nearly two years. Promoted minister plenipotentiary in 1944, he became the second Canadian Ambassador to the United States on 1 January 1945. He remained in this position through September 1946.

Pearson had an important part in founding both the United Nations and the North Atlantic Treaty Organization (NATO).

Pearson nearly became the first Secretary-General of the United Nations in 1946, but he was vetoed by the Soviet Union. He was also the leading candidate for Secretary-General in the 1953 selection, when the British conducted a vigorous campaign on his behalf. He placed first with 10 out of 11 votes in the Security Council, but the lone negative vote was another Soviet veto. The Security Council instead settled on Dag Hammarskjöld of Sweden; all UN Secretaries-General would come from neutral countries for the rest of the Cold War.

The Canadian Prime Minister, Mackenzie King, tried to recruit Pearson into his government as the war wound down. Pearson felt honoured by King's approach, but he resisted at the time, due to his personal dislike of King's poor personal style and political methods. Pearson did not make the move into politics until a few years later, after King had announced his retirement as the Prime Minister of Canada.

Secretary of State for External Affairs (1948-1957)

In 1948, before his retirement, Prime Minister King appointed Pearson Secretary of State for External Affairs in the Liberal government. Shortly afterward, Pearson won a seat in the House of Commons, for the federal riding of Algoma East in Northern Ontario. Pearson then served as Secretary of State for External Affairs for Prime Minister Louis St. Laurent, until the defeat of the St. Laurent government in 1957.

Role in Suez crisis leads to Nobel Peace Prize
In 1957, for his role in resolving the Suez Crisis through the United Nations one year earlier, Pearson was awarded the Nobel Peace Prize. The selection committee argued that Pearson had "saved the world", but critics accused him of betraying the motherland and Canada's ties with the UK. Pearson and UN Secretary-General Dag Hammarskjöld are considered the fathers of the modern concept of peacekeeping. Together, they were able to organize the United Nations Emergency Force by way of a five-day fly-around in early November 1956 after the First emergency special session of the United Nations General Assembly. His Nobel medal was on permanent display in the front lobby of the Lester B. Pearson Building, the headquarters of Global Affairs Canada in Ottawa until 2017 when the medal was loaned to the Canadian Museum of History, to be displayed in the 'Canadian History Hall'.

Party leadership

St. Laurent was defeated by the Progressive Conservatives under John Diefenbaker in the election of 1957. After just a few months as Leader of the Opposition, St. Laurent retired, and he endorsed Pearson as his successor. Pearson was elected leader of the Liberal Party at its leadership convention of 1958, defeating his chief rival, former cabinet minister Paul Martin Sr.

At his first parliamentary session as opposition leader, Pearson asked Diefenbaker to give power back to the Liberals without an election, because of a recent economic downturn. This strategy backfired when Diefenbaker showed a classified Liberal document saying that the economy would face a downturn in that year. This contrasted heavily with the Liberals' campaign promises of 1957.

Consequently, Pearson's party was routed in the federal election of 1958. The Liberals lost more than half their seats, while Diefenbaker's Conservatives won the largest majority ever seen in Canada to that point (208 of 265 seats). Furthermore, the election cost the Liberals their stronghold in Quebec. This province had voted largely Liberal in federal elections since the Conscription Crisis of 1917, but Quebec had no favourite son leader, as it had had since 1948.

Pearson convened a significant "Thinkers' Conference" at Kingston, Ontario in 1960. This event developed many of the ideas later implemented when he became the Prime Minister.

In the federal election of 1962, the Liberals, led by Pearson, and the surprise election of 30 Social Credit MP's, deprived the Tories of their majority. As a consequence, Diefenbaker now had to preside over a minority government.

Not long after the election, Pearson capitalized on the Conservatives' indecision on accepting American nuclear warheads on Canadian BOMARC missiles. Defence Minister Douglas Harkness resigned from Cabinet on 4 February 1963, because of Diefenbaker's opposition to accepting the warheads. On the next day, the government lost two nonconfidence motions on the issue, forcing a national election. In that election, the Liberals took 129 seats to the Tories' 95. Despite winning 41 percent of the vote, the Liberals came up five seats short of a majority largely because of winning just three seats on the Prairies. With the support of six Social Credit MPs from Quebec, Pearson was able to guarantee stable government to the Governor-General, and Diefenbaker resigned, allowing Pearson to form a minority government. He was sworn in as prime minister on 22 April 1963.

Prime Minister (1963–1968)

Domestic policy and events
Pearson campaigned during the 1963 election promising "60 Days of Decision" and supported the Bomarc surface-to-air missile program. Pearson never had a majority in the House of Commons, but he brought in many of Canada's major updated social programs, including universal health care (though that credit should be shared with Tommy Douglas, who as premier of Saskatchewan had introduced the country's first medicare system), the Canada Pension Plan, and Canada Student Loans. Pearson instituted a new national flag, the Maple Leaf flag, after a national debate known as the Great Canadian flag debate. He also instituted the 40-hour work week, two weeks vacation time, and a new minimum wage for workers in federally-regulated areas.

Pearson also started a number of royal commissions, including the Royal Commission on the Status of Women and the Royal Commission on Bilingualism and Biculturalism. These suggested changes that helped create legal equality for women and brought official bilingualism into being. After Pearson's term in office, French was made an official language, and the Canadian government provided services in both English and French. Pearson himself had hoped that he would be the last unilingual Prime Minister of Canada and fluency in both English and French became an unofficial requirement for candidates for Prime Minister after Pearson left office.

In 1967, Pearson's government introduced a discrimination-free points-based system which encouraged immigration to Canada, making it the first country in the world to do so.

Pearson oversaw Canada's centennial celebrations in 1967 before retiring. The Canadian news agency, The Canadian Press, named him "Newsmaker of the Year" that year, citing his leadership during the centennial celebrations, which brought the Centennial Flame to Parliament Hill.

Foreign policy

On 15 January 1964, Pearson became the first Canadian Prime Minister to make an official state visit to France.

In 1967, French president Charles de Gaulle made a visit to Quebec. A staunch advocate of Quebec separatism, de Gaulle went so far as to say that his procession in Montreal reminded him of his return to Paris after it was freed from the Nazis during the Second World War. President de Gaulle also gave his "Vive le Québec libre" speech during the visit. Given Canada's efforts in aiding France during both world wars, Pearson was enraged. He rebuked de Gaulle in a speech the following day, remarking that "Canadians do not need to be liberated", and made it clear that de Gaulle was no longer welcome in Canada.

Pearson signed the Canada–United States Automotive Agreement (or Auto Pact) in January 1965, and unemployment fell to its lowest rate in over a decade.

While in office, Pearson declined U.S. requests to send Canadian combat troops into the Vietnam War. Pearson spoke at Temple University in Philadelphia on 2 April 1965 and voiced his support for a pause in the American bombing of North Vietnam, so that a diplomatic solution to the crisis might unfold. To President Lyndon B. Johnson, this criticism of American foreign policy on American soil was intolerable. Before Pearson had finished his speech, he was invited to Camp David, Maryland, to meet with Johnson the next day. Johnson, who was notorious for his personal touch in politics, reportedly grabbed Pearson by the lapels and shouted, "You pissed on my rug!" Text of his Philadelphia speech, however, showed that Pearson in fact supported President Johnson's policy in Vietnam, even stating "The government and great majority of people of my country have supported wholeheartedly the US peacekeeping and peacemaking policies in Vietnam."

After this incident, Johnson and Pearson did have further contacts, including two more meetings together, both times in Canada. Canada's exported raw materials and resources helped fuel and sustain American efforts in the Vietnam War.

Military
Pearson's government endured significant controversy in Canada's military services throughout the mid-1960s, following the tabling of the White Paper on Defence in March 1964. This document laid out a plan to merge the Royal Canadian Navy, the Royal Canadian Air Force, and the Canadian Army to form a single service called the Canadian Forces. Military unification took effect on 1 February 1968, when The Canadian Forces Reorganization Act received Royal Assent.

Supreme Court appointments

Pearson chose the following jurists to be appointed as justices of the Supreme Court of Canada by the Governor General:
 Robert Taschereau (as chief justice, 22 April 1963 – 1 September 1967; appointed a puisne justice under Prime Minister King, 9 February 1940)
 Wishart Flett Spence (30 May 1963 – 29 December 1978)
 John Robert Cartwright (as Chief Justice, 1 September 1967 – 23 March 1970; appointed a Puisne Justice under Prime Minister St. Laurent, 22 December 1949)
 Louis-Philippe Pigeon (21 September 1967 – 8 February 1980)

Retirement

After his 14 December 1967 announcement that he was retiring from politics, a leadership convention was held. Pearson's successor was Pierre Trudeau, whom Pearson had recruited and made justice minister in his cabinet. Two other cabinet ministers Pearson had recruited, John Turner and Jean Chrétien, served as prime ministers following Trudeau's retirement.

After politics
From 1968 to 1969, Pearson served as chairman of the Commission on International Development (Pearson Commission on International Development), which was sponsored by the World Bank. Following his retirement, he lectured at Carleton University in Ottawa while writing his memoirs. From 1970 to 1972, he was the first chairman of the Board of Governors of the International Development Research Centre. From 1969 until his death in 1972, he was chancellor of Carleton University.

Pearson had planned to write a three-volume set of memoirs with the title "Mike: The Memoirs of the Rt. Hon. Lester B. Pearson". The first volume was published in 1972. The other two volumes, after his death, were published in 1973 and 1975 but they lack the authenticity due to apparent bias from the ghostwriters who wrote it.

Illness and death

In 1970, Pearson underwent a surgery to have his right eye removed to remove a tumor in that area.

In November 1972, it was reported that he was admitted to the hospital for further unspecified treatment, but the prognosis was poor. He tried to write at this juncture the story of his prime ministerial career, but his condition, which was already precarious, deteriorated rapidly by Christmas Eve.

On 27 December 1972, it was announced that the cancer had spread to the liver and Pearson had lapsed into a coma. He died at 11:40 pm ET on 27 December 1972 in his Ottawa home.

Pearson is buried at Maclaren Cemetery in Wakefield, Quebec (just north of Gatineau), next to his close External Affairs colleagues H. H. Wrong and Norman Robertson.

Honours and awards

 

  

  

 Elected a Foreign Honorary Member of the American Academy of Arts and Sciences in 1957.
 The Canadian Press named Pearson "Newsmaker of the Year" nine times, a record he held until his successor, Pierre Trudeau, surpassed it in 2000. He was also only one of two prime ministers to have received the honour both before and when prime minister (the other being Brian Mulroney).
Pearson was inducted into the Canadian Peace Hall of Fame in 2000.
 The Pearson Medal of Peace, first awarded in 1979, is an award given out annually by the United Nations Association in Canada to recognize an individual Canadian's "contribution to international service".
 A plaque, placed by the Ontario Heritage Trust, is on the grounds of Newtonbrook United Church, the successor congregation to the one that owned the manse.
 In a survey by Canadian historians of the first 20 Prime Ministers through Jean Chrétien, Pearson ranked No. 6.
 In a survey by Canadian historians of the Canadian prime ministers who served after World War II, Pearson was ranked first "by a landslide".

Order of Canada Citation
Pearson was appointed a Companion of the Order of Canada on 28 June 1968. His citation reads:

Former Prime Minister of Canada. For his services to Canada at home and abroad.

Educational and academic institutions

 The Lester B. Pearson United World College, opened in 1974 as the second United World College, near Victoria, British Columbia.
 The Pearson Peacekeeping Centre, established in 1994, is an independent not-for-profit institution providing research and training on all aspects of peace operations.
 The Lester B. Pearson School Board is the largest English-language school board in Quebec. The majority of the schools of the Lester B. Pearson School Board are located on the western half of the island of Montreal, while a few of its schools located off the island.
 Lester B. Pearson High School lists five so-named schools, in Burlington, Calgary, Montreal, Ottawa, and Toronto.
There are Lester B. Pearson elementary schools in Ajax, Ontario; Aurora, Ontario; Brampton, Ontario; London, Ontario; Saskatoon, Saskatchewan; Waterloo, Ontario and Wesleyville, Newfoundland.
Mike's Place, the Graduate Student Pub at Carleton University was named in 1973 in honour of Lester B. Pearson with permission of his estate.

Civic and civil infrastructure

 Toronto Pearson International Airport, first opened in 1939 and re-christened with its current name in 1984, is Canada's busiest airport.
 The Lester B. Pearson Building, completed in 1973, is the headquarters for the Department of Foreign Affairs and International Trade, a tribute to his service as external affairs minister.
 Lester B. Pearson Civic Centre in Elliot Lake, Ontario was heavily damaged in February 2019.
 Lester B. Pearson Garden for Peace and Understanding, E.J. Pratt Library in the University of Toronto, completed in 2004 
 Lester B. Pearson Place, completed in 2006, is a four-storey affordable housing building in Newtonbrook, Toronto, near his place of birth, and adjacent to Newtonbrook United Church.
 Lester B. Pearson Park in St. Catharines, Ontario.
 Pearson Avenue is located near Highway 407 and Yonge Street in Richmond Hill, Ontario, Canada; less than five miles from his place of birth.
 Pearson Way is an arterial access road located in a new subdivision in Milton, Ontario; many ex-prime ministers are being honoured in this growing community, including Prime Ministers Pierre Trudeau and Wilfrid Laurier.
 Pearson Plaza, a mall being developed in Elliot Lake to replace the Algo Centre Mall.
 Pearson Park, a playground built in 2013 in Wesleyville, Newfoundland.

Sports
 The award for the best National Hockey League player as voted by members of the National Hockey League Players' Association (NHLPA) was known as the Lester B. Pearson Award from its inception in 1971 to 2010, when its name was changed to the Ted Lindsay Award to honour one of the union's pioneers.
 Pearson was inducted into the Sports Hall of Fame at the University of Toronto in 1987.
 Pearson was inducted into the Canadian Baseball Hall of Fame in 1983.
 The Pearson Cup was a baseball competition between the Toronto Blue Jays and Montreal Expos. Pearson also served as Expos' Honorary Club President from 1969 to 1972.

Honorary degrees

Honorary Degrees

Freedom of the City
  1967: London

Electoral record

Bibliography

 Archives
Lester B. Pearson fonds at Library and Archives Canada
 Works by Pearson

Pearson published one memoir in his lifetime. The other two were written after his death by ghostwriters and they lack the authenticity.
 
 online free
 Mike: The Memoirs of the Rt. Hon. Lester B. Pearson: 1957–1968 vol 3  online free
Works about Pearson
 Bothwell, R. Pearson (1978)
 Canadian Encyclopedia. "Lester B. Pearson"  (2015)online
 English, John. Shadow of heaven : the life of Lester Pearson: Volume 1 1897–1948 (1990) online free
 
 
  Also  and  online free.
  Also .
  Also .
 Lester Pearson's Peacekeeping: The Truth May Hurt by Yves Engler Publication Date: Feb 2012 Pages: 160

See also

 List of prime ministers of Canada
 Canada and the Vietnam War
 Great Canadian Flag Debate
 Landon Pearson
 Canada and the United Nations

References

External links

  including the Nobel Lecture* on 11 December 1957 The Four Faces of Peace
 Biography at the Library and Archives Canada
 
 Lester B. Pearson: From Peacemaker to Prime Minister at the CBC Digital Archives
 Lester Bowles Pearson at The Canadian Encyclopedia
 An in-depth exploration of Pearson’s diplomacy during the Suez Crisis of 1956, created by National Dream Productions in conjunction with The Historica Dominion Institute

1897 births
1972 deaths
Lester B. Pearson
Canadian people of Anglo-Irish descent
Ambassadors of Canada to the United States
Canadian Baseball Hall of Fame inductees
Canadian male non-fiction writers
Canadian ice hockey players
Canadian Methodists
Canadian military personnel of World War I
Canadian Nobel laureates
Canadian memoirists
Academic staff of Carleton University
Chancellors of Carleton University
Companions of the Order of Canada
Fellows of the American Academy of Arts and Sciences
Fellows of St John's College, Oxford
Leaders of the Liberal Party of Canada
Leaders of the Opposition (Canada)
Members of the 17th Canadian Ministry
Members of the 19th Canadian Ministry
Members of the House of Commons of Canada from Ontario
Members of the Order of Merit
Canadian members of the Privy Council of the United Kingdom
Members of the King's Privy Council for Canada
Members of the United Church of Canada
Nobel Peace Prize laureates
Canadian Officers of the Order of the British Empire
Writers from Toronto
Presidents of the United Nations General Assembly
Prime Ministers of Canada
Royal Flying Corps officers
University of Toronto alumni
Alumni of St John's College, Oxford
Academic staff of the University of Toronto
Canadian Secretaries of State for External Affairs
Persons of National Historic Significance (Canada)
Canadian World War I pilots
People of the Cold War
Deaths from cancer in Ontario
Deaths from liver cancer
Lester
Politicians from Toronto
20th-century Canadian historians
20th-century Canadian politicians
Royal Canadian Geographical Society fellows
20th-century memoirists